

A merkin  is a pubic wig. Merkins were worn by sex workers after shaving their mons pubis, and are now used as decorative items or erotic devices by both men and women.

History and etymology
The Oxford Companion to the Body dates the origin of the pubic wig to the 1450s. According to the publication, women would shave their pubic hair for personal hygiene and to combat pubic lice. They would then put on a merkin. Also, sex workers would wear a merkin to cover up signs of disease, such as syphilis.

The Oxford English Dictionary dates the first written use of the term to 1617. The word probably originated from malkin, a derogatory term for a lower-class young woman, or from Marykin, a pet form of the female given name Mary.

Contemporary use
Sometimes in filmmaking, merkins can be worn especially by actresses to avoid inadvertent exposure of the genitalia during nude or semi-nude scenes. The presence of the merkin protects the actor from inadvertently performing "full-frontal" nudity which can help ensure that the film achieves a less restrictive MPAA rating.<ref>Duchovny, David DVD commentary for Steven Soderbergh's Full Frontal''</ref>

A merkin may also be used when the actor or actress has less pubic hair than is required, as in the nude dancing extras in The Bank Job. Amy Landecker wore a merkin in A Serious Man (2009) for a nude sunbathing scene; bikini waxing was neither common nor fashionable in 1967 when the film is set.

Lucy Lawless was fitted for a merkin for the 2010 TV series Spartacus: Blood and Sand, but did not use it.
In an interview for Allure, Kate Winslet related how she refused to wear a merkin in The Reader.Hannah Morrill. Kate Winslet, Unscripted, Allure, 2009-06-03.NOTE: Many sources claim that she wore a merkin by only quoting part of this interview (found in full in the printed issue):"Let me tell you, The Reader was not glamorous for me in terms of body-hair maintenance. I had to grow it in, because you can't have a landing strip in 1950, you know? And then because of years of waxing, as all of us girls know, it doesn't come back quite the way it used to. They even made me a merkin because they were so concerned that I might not be able to grow enough. I said, 'Guys, I am going to have to draw the line at a pubic wig, but you can shoot my own snatch up close and personal.'"Another Allure source (used here) also says she didn't wear it.
At the São Paulo Fashion Week in 2010, the design firm Neon dressed a nude model in transparent plastic. According to the designer, the model wore a pubic wig to make her appear more natural. 
In an interview, Gina Gershon revealed that she wore a merkin in Killer Joe.
In the director's audio commentary of The Girl with the Dragon Tattoo, director David Fincher discussed how a merkin was used for actress Rooney Mara, after she suggested to him that the character she portrayed in the movie was a natural redhead in the book and actually dyed her hair black. Consequently, the merkin she wore was made in the color red. For the release of the movie in Japan, Fincher stated: "I believe in Japan we had to put a mosaic over it because fake pubes are considered to be ... nasty."Rooney Mara Naked, Merkin Details For 'The Girl With The Dragon Tattoo', The Huffington Post, 2011-12-13
In Stanley Kubrick's film Dr. Strangelove the character of the President of the United States, played by Peter Sellers, is bald and is named "Merkin Muffley".
In the Italian film La Pelle (English: The Skin), which takes place during the Allied occupation of Naples after World War II, blond merkins are made for the local prostitutes to pass for blondes for the US soldiers.
In the television series Black Sails, Jessica Parker Kennedy wore a pubic wig.
In the film The Greasy Strangler, the character Janet donned a merkin.
In the film Never Been Kissed'', the main character Josie Gellar’s assistant is named Merkin. The character is portrayed by Sean Whalen.
In 2022, in response to the passing of reforms to the Gender Recognition Act in Scotland, Elaine Miller wearing a pubic wig flashed the Scottish parliament chamber in protest.

References

External links

Wigs
Feminine hygiene